Tuttle (formerly Turner) is an unincorporated community and census-designated place (CDP) in Merced County, California, United States. The population was 102 at the 2020 census.

The town was named for R.H. Tuttle, an official of the railroad.

Geography
Tuttle is in eastern Merced County along California State Route 140, which leads west into Merced and northeast  to Mariposa in the foothills of the Sierra Nevada.

Demographics
At the 2010 census Tuttle had a population of 103. The racial makeup of Tuttle was 77 (74.8%) White, 6 (5.8%) African American, 0 (0.0%) Native American, 6 (5.8%) Asian, 0 (0.0%) Pacific Islander, 9 (8.7%) from other races, and 5 (4.9%) from two or more races. Hispanic or Latino of any race were 31 people (30.1%).

The whole population lived in households, no one lived in non-institutionalized group quarters and no one was institutionalized.

There were 35 households, 11 (31.4%) had children under the age of 18 living in them, 21 (60.0%) were opposite-sex married couples living together, 3 (8.6%) had a female householder with no husband present, 4 (11.4%) had a male householder with no wife present.  There were 4 (11.4%) unmarried opposite-sex partnerships, and 0 (0%) same-sex married couples or partnerships. 6 households (17.1%) were one person and 3 (8.6%) had someone living alone who was 65 or older. The average household size was 2.94.  There were 28 families (80.0% of households); the average family size was 3.14.

The age distribution was 21 people (20.4%) under the age of 18, 10 people (9.7%) aged 18 to 24, 23 people (22.3%) aged 25 to 44, 31 people (30.1%) aged 45 to 64, and 18 people (17.5%) who were 65 or older.  The median age was 43.5 years. For every 100 females, there were 128.9 males.  For every 100 females age 18 and over, there were 134.3 males.

There were 39 housing units at an average density of 22.2 per square mile, of the occupied units 24 (68.6%) were owner-occupied and 11 (31.4%) were rented. The homeowner vacancy rate was 0%; the rental vacancy rate was 14.3%.  77 people (74.8% of the population) lived in owner-occupied housing units and 26 people (25.2%) lived in rental housing units.

References

Census-designated places in Merced County, California
Census-designated places in California